Nodozana thricophora is a moth of the subfamily Arctiinae. It was described by George Hampson in 1900. It is found in Panama.

References

Lithosiini
Moths described in 1885